The Annie Award for Character Animation in an Animated Television/Broadcast Production is an Annie Award given annually to the best character animation for television or broadcasting productions. It was first presented at the 34th Annie Awards.

Winners and nominees

2000s

2010s

2020s

References

External links 
 Annie Awards: Legacy

Annie Awards